Harvest Home is a 1995 Philippine melodrama film directed by Carlos Siguion-Reyna and produced by Armida Siguion-Reyna. The film stars Maricel Soriano and Snooky Serna as sisters reunited after the death of their father. Based on a story by Oscar Miranda, Bibeth Orteza, and Carlos Siguion-Reyna, it was written for the screen by Orteza.

The film was selected as the Philippines entry for the Best Foreign Language Film at the 68th Academy Awards but was not accepted as a nominee.

Plot
In a quiet, rural village, Jacinta (Maricel Soriano) patiently tends to her mother Alemda (Armida Siguion-Reyna), a religious and pious woman who has slowly been losing her sanity since the death of her husband Arcadio (Robert Arevalo) several years prior. Jacinta is shown to be hard-working in the field and is admired by the women of the village as a dutiful daughter and wife, all in spite of the cold treatment shown by her husband Peping (Tirso Cruz III). 

Meanwhile, her younger sister Clarita (Snooky Serna) has not returned home in ten years since leaving to study in Manila. She has since married a lawyer from the city, Joey (Eric Quizon). 

Clarita travels with her husband to her hometown in order to sort out the land titles of Clarita and Jacinta's late father. The sisters are reunited but Clarita is uneasy being back home. Meanwhile, Peping shows animosity towards Clarita and Joey in part due to his previous relationship with Clarita before she left for Manila. 

When Joey and Almeda had a conversation, she dugged in their backyard and discovered some of the letters of Peping to Clarita. This would caused Almeda to become hysterical. Jacinta would eventually became furious at Joey because of what happened. Peping also told Clarita that he would send letters to her, and Clarita would also do the same thing. However, she would give those letters to Jacinta. But, Jacinta would never give the letters to each of them. While being cleaned up by Jacinta, Almeda told her that Joey is about to give the letters to Peping. Jacinta chased Joey with a bolo and attempted to hack him. But when Jacinta, Clarita, Peping, Joey and Almeda reached the cemetery where Arcadio is buried, Jacinta recalled when Arcadio discovered about the letters. She told her that Clarita is having a relationship with Arcadio. Clarita had already ran away from home, and in an intense confrontation, Jacinta pushed Arcadio and was hit at the back of the head by a sharp object killing him. Jacinta told her mother about the incestuous relationship of Clarita and Arcadio, and told her that no one should know about the death of her father. She also threatened her mother that if she would told anyone about it then she would say that Clarita was her father's mistress. Jacinta said to Clarita that even when they're young, she was the most beautiful and intelligent, even squandered the love of her father. The two fought intensely and when Jacinta was about to stab Clarita with a cross, she was stopped by Peping. Jacinta, then called Peping father, asked why he never loved her despite all of the hardwork she did. As Clarita and Joey were about to go back to Manila, they brought Almeda with them to undergo treatment. Clarita asked Peping to take care of Jacinta. Jacinta, now already lost her sanity, remembers the day when she saw Clarita being raped by Arcadio. But Clarita managed to escape. Jacinta then told her father to love her instead of Clarita. But Arcadio would laugh at her. Peping saw Jacinta crying about the incident. He told Jacinta that from now on, he will take care of Jacinta. On the fields, after harvesting rice, he saw Jacinta, dancing on the fields.

Cast

Digital restoration 
The film was digitally restored and remastered by the ABS-CBN Film Restoration Project (Sagip Pelikula) and Central Digital Lab. Due to the CoVID-19 pandemic, the film was premiered instead in digital platforms on December 17, 2020, through ABS-CBN's exclusive digital events service, KTX.ph and December 19, 2020, on digital streaming platforms iWantTFC and TFC IPTV.

Reception 
Emanuel Levy of Variety wrote that the film was "elegantly and smoothly executed," while praising the "strong performances" of actresses Maricel Soriano and Snooky Serna who "make their roles seem more compassionate and appealing than they actually are."

Accolades

References

External links
 

1995 films
1995 drama films
Philippine drama films
Filipino-language films
Films directed by Carlos Siguion-Reyna